Broad Run Golfer's Club (formerly known as Tattersall Golf Club) is a golf course located in West Bradford Township, Pennsylvania. The course was designed by Rees Jones, who is well known for designing many other prestigious courses. The course's Championship tees have a rating of 72.8.

Scorecard

References

External links 

Buildings and structures in Chester County, Pennsylvania
Golf clubs and courses in Pennsylvania
Golf clubs and courses designed by Rees Jones